Dichromia is a genus of moths of the family Erebidae first described by Achille Guenée in 1854.

Description
Palpi roughly scaled, where the second joint long and porrect (extending forward). Third joint obliquely upturned and ending in a naked point. A sharp frontal tuft present. Antennae minutely ciliated in the male. Forewings with the depressed and slightly acute apex. Veins 8 and 9 anastomosing (fusing) to form the areole. Hindwings with veins 3 and 4 from angle of cell. Vein 5 from below middle of discocellulars and veins 6 and 7 from upper angle.

Species
Some species of this genus are:

References

Lödl (2001). "Morphometry and relation patterns in male genitalia of noctuids (Lepidoptera: Noctuidae)". Quadrifina. Bd. 4: 5-33.

Hypeninae
Noctuoidea genera